Margaret Johnson Bailes (born January 23, 1951) is an American athlete who competed in the 100 and 200 meters.

Early life
Margaret Johnson Bailes was born in the Bronx. When she was five, she moved to Eugene, Oregon with her family after her father, Albert "Duke" Johnson, decided it would be a good place to raise his children.

Athletic career
When Bailes was 9, a chance attendance as a spectator to an athletics event at Hayward Field led her to meet Wendy Jerome, the wife of Harry Jerome.  Wendy Jerome saw that Bailes had talent and soon became her coach. At 16 Bailes was one of the top U.S. sprinters with a fifth place in the 1967 AAU 200 m.

She competed for the United States in the 1968 Summer Olympics held in Mexico City, Mexico in the 4 x 100 meters where she won the gold medal with her teammates 100 m silver medalist Barbara Ferrell, Mildrette Netter and Olympic 100 m champion Wyomia Tyus.

Bailes still holds the all-time Oregon state high school records for 100 meters (11.29s) and 200 meters (22.95s), set in 1968 while she was a student at Churchill High School in Eugene, Oregon. She was inducted into the Oregon Sports Hall of Fame in 1991. She retired from the sport at the age of 17.

References

1951 births
Living people
American female sprinters
Athletes (track and field) at the 1968 Summer Olympics
Olympic gold medalists for the United States in track and field
Track and field athletes from Oregon
Medalists at the 1968 Summer Olympics
Winston Churchill High School (Eugene, Oregon) alumni
USA Outdoor Track and Field Championships winners
Olympic female sprinters
20th-century American women